The Colorado Tribute to Veterans Monument is a memorial commemorating World War I, World War II, Korea, Vietnam, and Persian Gulf War veterans, installed outside the Colorado State Capitol, in Denver. The monument was dedicated on November 10, 1990.

References

1990 establishments in Colorado
Monuments and memorials in Colorado
Military monuments and memorials in the United States
Outdoor sculptures in Denver